The Wesley Hospital is a hospital located in the suburb of Auchenflower in Brisbane, Queensland, Australia.

The hospital currently has over 530 beds and offers a large range of clinical services.
It is owned and operated by UnitingCare Health. The hospital recently underwent works and an extension.

The hospital is well known for its 'Kim Walters Choices Program' which supports men, women and their families who have been diagnosed with breast or gynecological cancer. This program is free.

Transport
The Wesley Hospital is accessible by bus routes which travel along Coronation Drive, and also from Auchenflower Rail Station which is situated behind the hospital.

History
The Wesley Hospital has its roots in St Helen's Hospital (Brisbane) at South Brisbane, which sat on the banks of the Brisbane River   in the current location of the State Library of Queensland. In the late 1960s, it became clear St Helen's Hospital could not expand on its existing site. This led to the purchase of the Moorlands Estate at Auchenflower in 1971. The State Government would not allow the hospital to operate on two sites under the same name, so the new site became Wesley Hospital. Construction commenced in 1975 and the Wesley Hospital received its first patients by ambulance convoy from St Helen's on 1 March 1977.

References

Hospital buildings completed in 1977
Hospitals in Brisbane
Teaching hospitals in Australia
Hospitals established in 1896
1896 establishments in Australia
1977 establishments in Australia
Auchenflower, Queensland